Peragaswatte Liyana Acharige Somapala (13 September 1921 – 26 March 1991 ), popularly known as P. L. A. Somapala was a Sri Lankan singer, musician and playback singer in Sri Lankan cinema. One of the earliest pillars in Sinhala classical songs, Somapala made several contributions to early Sinhala cinema as a playback singer and music director along with his wife Chithra Somapala.

Personal life
Somapala was born on 13 September 1921 in Maligakanda, Colombo 10, Sri Lanka. His father, A. D. Edmund, was also a stage drama producer. He received his primary education at Clifton Girls' School and his secondary education at Lawrence College, Maradana. He left school in 1941 and worked as a clerk in a Maliban Street office of a rubber exporter.

Somapala met his future wife Chithra Perera Somapala (b. 1932) in 1942, when she was studying at St Bridget's Convent. Chithra was also a singer, and in 1948, she sang for Columbia Records under Master U. D. Perera. They married on 27 September 1952. The couple had four sons: Prasanna, Rohan, Nalin, Chitral and one daughter, Piumi. The eldest son Prasanna is a retired cameraman who worked in the Ministry of Mahaweli. Their younger son Chitral Somapala is a playback singer, composer and musician.

In 1991, Somapala went to India for eye surgery where he later died of cancer on 26 March 1991 at the age of 69. Chitra Somapala died in 1994.

Career
It was during his time at rubber company, he learned music from musicians T. Sandarasekara and Lionel Edirisinghe. Then he excelled sitar and violin. During this time, he worked as a sub-music director for a stage play called Carnival. The play was produced by his father and wrote by Mathupala, his elder uncle. His younger uncle A. D. Piyasena also played a child character in this play. In 1942, Somapala passed as a Radio Artist. His first song was recorded with renowned musicians Sunil Santha and Surya Sankar Molligoda.

At the same time, he met his future wife Chithra Somapala. In 1946, he first sang a song with Chitra. He composed many songs to Chitra and together they sang several duets including: Yamuna Yamuna Sobana, Dambulu Gale and Sukomala Bada Lelawa. For this song Yamuna Yamuna Sobana, Somapala first used clarinet, saxophone, piano, guitar, drummer, double bass. That song became world famous where the daughter of Governor Soulbury, Ramsbottom requested this song and sent it to H. M. V label which was put on disk and sent abroad. In 1954, the film East in the West produced by the British Department of State Information had the good fortune of incorporating the song Isurumuniya into a foreign film for the first time.

The duo later made several popular songs in the early classical song history such as: Lalita Kalā Opa Karanā, Sīgiri Landunē æyi Oba Thanivī, Dambulu Galē, Dunhinda Hælenā, Sukomala Banda Lelavā, Uḍaraṭa Kandukara Siriyā Paradana, Sarasamu Lankā Naḷavamu Lankā, Isurumuṇiyehi Pætali Galeka, Dakuṇu Lakē Aga Nagarē Gālu Purē Siri, Nuvara Alankārē, Nuvara Vævē, Pembara Mātā and Raṭa Raṭa Ekkoṭa.

On 4 March 1955, he became a film music director with the blockbuster Asoka. Somapala composed the music for the film and all the songs were extremely popular and all the songs were taken from Hindi and Tamil films. Some songs were taken from the Hindi films Anarkali and Dosth and also from the Tamil films Avan. Some songs such as Katharagame, Pem Geethe and Sumihiri Paane were recorded twice in Sri Lanka and in Madras for commercials.

In 1958, Somapala became a radio producer and became an additional music controller. Somapala was involved in a film for the second time in 1956 with Dingiri Menika. In the film, he was a co-music director with an Indian composer S. S. Veda. In the film, he produced the popular songs: Peradiga Muthu Atayay Me and Goviyawe Rataka Bale. Somapala directed music for 51 films of many genre which include the blockbusters Deyiyannē Raṭē, Deepaśhikā, Hathara Maha Nidhānaya, Kinkiṇi Paāda, Sudu Duva, Akka Nagō, Pravēsam Venna, Dæn Matakada, Hathara Denāma Sūrayō, Adarē Hitenava Dækkama, Abhirahasa, Suhada Pætuma, Thuṣhārā, Sūrayā Sūrayāmayi, Lassana Kella, Damayanthi, Pembara Madhū and Chaṇḍi Shyāmā.

All the songs composed and directed by Somapala for the film Deepashika were popular but were imitated from Indian film songs. Somapala and Chitra won the Swarna Sankha Award for Popular Film Music Director in 1966. They have performed in London, Paris, Wales, California and Geneva. However in the late 1983, many people accuse Somapala of copying Hindi melodies. But, he stated that he put a series of local lyrics to a Hindi song and present it through a series of melodies that touch the heart of the local fans. On Sunday, 18 May 1952, Somapala wrote an article in Lankadeepa entitled 'Why do I do hybrid music?' to answer criticism. Most of his film songs were written by Karunaratne Abeysekera where all became popular.

Filmography

References

External links

1921 births
1991 deaths
20th-century Sri Lankan male singers
Sri Lankan playback singers
Sri Lankan singer-songwriters
Sinhalese singers